Avva is a 2008 Indian Kannada language drama film directed by Kavitha Lankesh and produced by Pyramid Saimira. The film stars Shruti, Duniya Vijay and Smitha in the lead roles. The film released to positive critical reception and won multiple awards at the Karnataka State Film Awards for that year. The musical score was composed by Issac Thomas Kottukapalli.

The film is based on the novel "Mussanjeya Katha Prasanga" by P. Lankesh. The film speaks about the modern day rural lifestyle, where the caste system, politics and human greed takes over the traditional human values.

Cast
 Shruti as Aane Baddi Rangavva
 Duniya Vijay as Byadara Manja
 Smitha as Savanthri
 Rangayana Raghu as Baramanna
 Master Rakesh
 Suchendra Prasad
 Arundhati Nayak
 Enagi Nataraj
 Prasanna
 Ashwath
 Hanumakka

Release
The film was released on 8 February 2008 in Karnataka. The film met with wide positive critical response particularly for the lead actors performances.

Awards
 Karnataka State Film Awards
 Best Supporting Actress : Smitha
 Best Story writer: P. Lankesh

References

2008 films
2000s Kannada-language films
Indian drama films
Films based on Indian novels
Films directed by Kavitha Lankesh
2008 drama films